The art of motion-picture making within Spain or by Spanish filmmakers abroad is collectively known as Spanish Cinema. ICAA is the State agency charged with regulating the allocation of public funds to the domestic film industry.

In recent years, Spanish cinema has achieved high marks of recognition. In the long history of Spanish cinema, the great filmmaker Luis Buñuel was the first to achieve universal recognition, followed by Pedro Almodóvar in the 1980s. Spanish cinema has also seen international success over the years with films by directors like Segundo de Chomón, Florián Rey, Luis García Berlanga, Juan Antonio Bardem, Carlos Saura, Julio Médem and Alejandro Amenábar.

Non-directors, like the cinematographer Néstor Almendros, the art director Gil Parrondo, the screenwriter Rafael Azcona, the actresses Maribel Verdú and, especially, Penélope Cruz and the actors Fernando Rey, Francisco Rabal, Antonio Banderas, Javier Bardem and Fernando Fernán Gómez, have obtained significant recognition outside Spain.

Only a small portion of box office sales in Spain are generated by domestic films. The Spanish government has therefore implemented measures aimed at supporting local film production and movie theaters, which include the assurance of funding from the main national television stations. The trend is being reversed with productions such as the €30 million film Alatriste (starring Viggo Mortensen), the Academy Award-winning Spanish film Pan's Labyrinth (starring Maribel Verdú), Volver (starring Penélope Cruz and Carmen Maura), and Los Borgia (starring Paz Vega), all of them sold-out blockbusters in Spain.

Another aspect of Spanish cinema mostly unknown to the general public is the appearance of English-language Spanish films such as Agora (directed by Alejandro Amenábar and starring Rachel Weisz), Ché (directed by Steven Soderbergh and starring Benicio del Toro), The Machinist (starring Christian Bale), The Others (starring Nicole Kidman), Miloš Forman’s Goya's Ghosts (starring Javier Bardem and Natalie Portman), A Monster Calls (directed by J. A. Bayona and starring Sigourney Weaver and Liam Neeson), and The Impossible (starring Ewan McGregor and Naomi Watts). All of these films were produced by Spanish firms.

History

The first Spanish film exhibition took place on May 5, 1895, in Barcelona. Exhibitions of Lumière films were screened in Madrid, Malaga and Barcelona in May and December of 1896, respectively.

The matter of which Spanish film came first is in doubt. The first was either Salida de la misa de doce de la Iglesia del Pilar de Zaragoza (Exit of the Twelve O'Clock Mass from the Church of El Pilar of Zaragoza) by Eduardo Jimeno Peromarta, Plaza del puerto en Barcelona (Plaza of the Port of Barcelona) by Alexandre Promio or the anonymous film Llegada de un tren de Teruel a Segorbe (Arrival of a Train from Teruel in Segorbe). It is also possible that the first film was Riña en un café (Brawl in a Café) by the prolific filmmaker Fructuós Gelabert. These films were all released in 1897.

The first Spanish film director to achieve great success internationally was Segundo de Chomón, who worked in France and Italy but made several famous fantasy films in Spain, such as El Hotel eléctrico.

The height of silent cinema

In 1914, Barcelona was the center of the nation's film industry.  The españoladas (historical epics of Spain) predominated until the 1960s.  Prominent among these were the films of Florián Rey, starring Imperio Argentina, and the first version of Nobleza Baturra (1925).  Historical dramas such as Vida de Cristóbal Colón y su Descubrimiento de América (The Life of Christopher Columbus and His Discovery of America) (1917), by the French director Gerald Bourgeois, adaptations of newspaper serials such as Los misterios de Barcelona (The Mysteries of Barcelona) starring Joan Maria Codina (1916), and of stage plays such as Don Juan Tenorio (1922), by Ricardo de Baños, and zarzuelas (comedic operettas), were also produced.  Even the Nobel Prize-winning playwright Jacinto Benavente, who said that "in film they pay me the scraps," would shoot film versions of his theatrical works.

In 1928, Ernesto Giménez Caballero and Luis Buñuel founded the first cine-club (film society), in Madrid. By that point, Madrid was already the primary center of the industry; 44 of the 58 films released up until that point had been produced there.

The rural drama La aldea maldita (The Cursed Village) (Florian Rey, 1929) was a hit in Paris, where, at the same time, Buñuel and Dalí premiered Un chien andalou (An Andalusian Dog). Un chien andalou has become one of the most well-known avant-garde films of that era.

The crisis of sound

By 1931, the introduction of audiophonic foreign productions had hurt the Spanish film industry to the point where only a single title was released that year.

In 1935, Manuel Casanova founded the Compañía Industrial Film Española S.A. (Spanish Industrial Film Company Inc, Cifesa) and introduced sound to Spanish film-making. CIFESA would grow to become the biggest production company to ever exist in Spain. Sometimes criticized as an instrument of the right wing, it nevertheless supported young filmmakers such as Luis Buñuel and his pseudo-documentary Las Hurdes: Tierra Sin Pan (Breadless Land). In 1933 it was responsible for filming 17 motion pictures and in 1934, 21. The most notable success was Benito Perojo´s La verbena de la paloma (The Dove's Verbena).They were also responsible for the 1947 Don Quijote de la Mancha, the most elaborate version of the Cervantes classic up to that time. By 1935 production had risen to 37 films.

The Civil War and its aftermath

The Civil War devastated the silent film era: only 10% of all silent films made before 1936 survived the war. Films were also destroyed for their celluloid content and made into goods.

Around 1936, both sides of the Civil War began to use cinema as a means of propaganda and censorship. A typical example of this is Luis Buñuel's España 1936, which also contains much rare newsreel footage. The pro-Franco side founded the National Department of Cinematography, causing many actors to go into exile.

The new regime then began to impose obligatory dubbing to highlight directors such as Ignacio F. Iquino, Rafael Gil (Huella de luz (1941)), Juan de Orduña (Locura de amor (1948)), Antonio Román (Los últimos de Filipinas (1945)), José Luis Sáenz de Heredia (Raza (1942)), and Edgar Neville.  Cifesa produced Ella, él y sus millones (1944) as well as Fedra (1956), by Manuel Mur Oti.

A policy of autarky tried to keep foreign currency in the country and establish a domestic film industry.
If the distributors wanted licences to import and dub foreign films (audiences preferred American films), they would have to acquire them from producers of local films.
The number of licences depended on the merits (artistic, moral, cultural, political) acknowledged by the government to each local film.
The American distributors of the MPAA tried to open the market removing the local producers.
To that end, they embargoed Spain since May 1951.
The embargo goes into 1952 due to complications with American studios outside MPAA and reorganizations within the Spanish government.
Spanish producers, lacking the income from the dubbing licences and with an uncertain future, greatly diminished their production as well.
An agreement between Spain and the United States was finally reached.

A 1954 report by Eduardo Moya from the Ministry of Trade remarks that the Spanish cinema industry has to become competitive at home and abroad.
Co-productions with France and Italy can bring the equipment and skills needed.

For its part, Marcelino pan y vino (1955) from Ladislao Vajda would trigger a trend of child actors, such as those who would become the protagonists of "Joselito," "Marisol," "Rocío Dúrcal" or "Pili y Mili."

In 1951, the regime instituted the Ministry of Information and Tourism to safeguard and develop the Spanish brand, the social imagery and the public image under the slogan "Spain is different" which was launched in the 1920s and then internationally spread in the 1960s. Its main purpose was to promote the Spanish tourist industry and a massive inflow of people who came from all the Europe towards the Andalusia, looking for what they saw in the Spanish films: sun and sea, comfortable transports and hotels, good ethnic cuisine, passion and adventure, and the so called españoladas (bulls, castanets, flamenco, Gitano culture and folklore).

Niebla y sol (1951) and Bienvenido Míster Marshall (1953) were the first movies belonging to the new genre of the "touristic cinema". Juan de Orduña would later have an enormous commercial hit with El Último Cuplé (1957), with leading actress Sara Montiel. It was followed by Veraneo en España (Miguel Iglesias, 1958) and by España otra vez (1969).

Social criticism
In the 1950s, the influence of neorealism became evident in the works of a number of rather young film directors (namely, Manuel Mur Oti, José Antonio Nieves Conde, Juan Antonio Bardem, Marco Ferreri, and Luis García Berlanga). Their main works (Surcos, Balarrasa, Todos somos necesarios, Orgullo, Muerte de un ciclista, Calle mayor, El pisito, El cochecito, Bienvenido Mister Marshall, or Plácido) ranged from melodrama to esperpento or black comedy, but all of them showed a strong social criticism, unexpected under a political censorship, like the one featured by Franco`s regime. From the amorality and selfishness of the upper middle class or the ridiculousness and mediocrity of the small town people to the hopelessness of the impoverished working class, every social stratum of the contemporary Spain was shown up.

Luis Buñuel in turn returned to Spain to film the shocking Viridiana (1961) and Tristana (1970).

Co-productions and foreign productions

Numerous co-productions with France and, most of all, Italy along the 1950s, 1960s and 1970s invigorated Spanish cinema both industrially and artistically. Actually the just mentioned Buñuel's movies were co-productions: Viridiana (1961) was Spanish-Mexican, and Tristana (1970) Spanish-French-Italian.
Also, the hundreds of Spaghetti-westerns and sword and sandal films shot in southern Spain by mixed Spanish-Italian teams were co-productions.

Under the Spanish-American agreements, part of the foreign profits locked in Spain since the war were invested in runaway productions to be distributed abroad.
Several American epic-scale superproductions or blockbusters were shot in Spain, produced either by Samuel Bronston, King of Kings (1961), El Cid (1961), 55 Days at Peking (1963), The Fall of the Roman Empire (1964), Circus World (1964)), or by others (Alexander the Great (1956), The Pride and the Passion (1957), Solomon and Sheba (1959), Lawrence of Arabia (1962), Doctor Zhivago (1965), The Trojan Women (1971)). These movies employed many Spanish technical professionals, and as a byproduct caused that some filmstars, like Ava Gardner and Orson Welles lived in Spain for years. Actually Welles, with Mr. Arkadin (1955), in fact a French-Spanish-Swiss co-production, was one of the first American filmmakers to devise Spain as location for his shootings, and he did it again for Chimes at Midnight (1966), this time a Spanish-Swiss co-production. 

Warner Bros., an American studio had opened its local headquarters in Spain in the early 1970s under the name of Warner Española S.A. Warner Española,  alongside releasing Warner Bros. films (as well as films by Disney theatrically in the late 80s-90s) is also involved in distribution of Spanish films such as Ensalada Baudelaire (1978), Adios Pequeña (1986) and most of 90s Pedro Almodóvar's films such as  Tacones lejanos, Kika and Carne termula.

Many international actors played in Spanish films: Italians Vittorio de Sica, Vittorio Gassman and Rossano Brazzi with Mexican María Félix in La corona negra; Italian couple Raf Vallone and Elena Varzi in Los ojos dejan huellas, Mexican Arturo de Córdova in Los peces rojos, Americans Betsy Blair in Calle mayor; Edmund Gwenn in Calabuch or Richard Basehart in Los jueves, milagro among many others. All the foreign actors were dubbed into Spanish. Mexican actor Gael García Bernal has also recently received international notoriety in films by Spanish directors.

The new Spanish cinema

In 1962, José María García Escudero became the Director General of Cinematography and Theatre, propelling forward state efforts and the Escuela Oficial de Cine (Official Cinema School), from which emerged the majority of new directors, generally from the political left and those opposed to the Franco government. Among these were Mario Camus, Miguel Picazo, Francisco Regueiro, Manuel Summers, and, above all, Carlos Saura. Apart from this line of directors, Fernando Fernán Gómez made the classic El extraño viaje (The Strange Trip) (1964) and Víctor Erice created the internationally acclaimed El espíritu de la colmena (The Spirit of the Beehive) (1973). From television came Jaime de Armiñan, author of Mi querida señorita (My Dear Lady) (1971).

From the so-called Escuela de Barcelona, originally more experimentalist and cosmopolitan, come Jacinto Esteva, Pere Portabella, Joaquin Jordan, Vicente Aranda, Jaime Camino, and Gonzalo Suárez, who made their master works in the 1980s.

In the Basque country the directors Fernando Larruquert, Nestor Basterretxea, José María Zabalza and the producer Elías Querejeta stood out.

The San Sebastian International Film Festival is a major film festival supervised by the FIAPF. It was started in 1953, and it takes place in San Sebastián every year. Alfred Hitchcock, Audrey Hepburn, Steven Spielberg, Gregory Peck, Elizabeth Taylor are some of the stars that have participated in this festival, the most important in Spain.

The Festival de Cine de Sitges, now known as the Festival Internacional de Cinema de Catalunya (International Film Festival of Catalonia), was started in 1967. It is considered one of the best cinematographic contests in Europe, and is the best in the specialty of science fiction film.

The 1968–1980 period saw the golden age of Spanish B-Movie horror, underpinning the term  to convey the set of films blending supernatural and horror themes that originated as an answer to European and American exploitation titles.

The cinema of the democratic era

With the end of dictatorship, censorship was greatly loosened and cultural works were permitted in other languages spoken in Spain besides Spanish, resulting in the founding of the Centro Galego de Artes da Imaxe - Filmoteca de Galicia or the Catalan Institute of Cinema, among others.

These films (whose lead performers sometimes were delinquent themselves) also ended up contributing to the promotion of an imaginary of symbolic violence associated to the naturalization of the punitive and non-rehabilitating function of the prison system.

During the democracy, a whole new series of directors base their films either on controversial topics or on revising the country's history. Jaime Chávarri, Víctor Erice, José Luis Garci, Manuel Gutiérrez Aragón, Eloy de la Iglesia, Pilar Miró and Pedro Olea were some of these who directed great films. Montxo Armendáriz or Juanma Bajo Ulloa's "new Basque cinema" has also been outstanding; another prominent Basque director is Julio Médem.

The Spanish cinema, however, depends on the great hits of the so-called comedia madrileña by Fernando Colomo or Fernando Trueba, the sophisticated melodramas by Pedro Almodóvar, Alex de la Iglesia and Santiago Segura's black humour or Alejandro Amenábar's works, in such a manner that, according to producer José Antonio Félez, "50% of total box office revenues comes from five titles, and between 8 and 10 films give 80% of the total" during the year 2004.

Foreign films often dominate box offices in Spain, with average monthly receipts of between EUR 35,000,000 and EUR 50,000,000, making Spain the 10th largest country in the world for international theatrical release, with a total gross of USD 193,304,925 in 2020, thus giving Spain a worldwide market share of 1.8%.

Awards 

The Goya Awards are the main film awards in Spain. They were established in 1987, a year after the founding of the Academia de las Artes y las Ciencias Cinematográficas de España, and recognize excellence in many aspects of Spanish motion picture making such as acting, directing and screenwriting. The first ceremony took place on March 16, 1987 at the Teatro Lope de Vega, Madrid. The ceremony continues to take place annually around the end of January, and awards are given to films produced during the previous year. The award itself is a small bronze bust of Francisco de Goya created by the sculptor José Luis Fernández.

In 2013, the Feroz Awards were established as the Spanish counterpart of the Golden Globe Awards.

There are several film festivals with important prizes for the industry. Owing to the adjoining celebrations of the festivals of San Sebastián, Sitges, Valladolid, and Seville from September to November, Autumn has become the season par excellence for the debut of Spanish pictures in the domestic commercial circuit. Meanwhile the Málaga Film Festival is generally held in early Spring.

English-language Spanish films

English-language films produced by Spanish companies include Two Much (directed by Fernando Trueba, 1995), The Others (Alejandro Amenábar, 2001), The Machinist (Brad Anderson, 2004), Basic Instinct 2 (produced by KanZaman Spain, 2006) or Miloš Forman’s Goya's Ghosts (Xuxa Produciones, 2006), The Impossible (directed by Juan Antonio Bayona, 2012, Apaches Entertainment and Telecinco Produciones).

KanZaman (Spain) and Recorded Picture Company (UK) co-produced Sexy Beast, directed by Jonathan Glazer, in 1999. Films co-produced by this company include The Reckoning (Paul McGuigan, 2003), The Bridge of San Luis Rey, based on the Pulitzer prize winning Thornton Wilder novel of the same name and directed by Mary McGuckian. It featured an ensemble cast consisting of Robert De Niro, Harvey Keitel, Kathy Bates and Spanish actress Pilar López de Ayala. Other films in this category are Mike Barker's A Good Woman (2004), and Sahara (Breck Eisner, 2005). In 2004, KanZaman co-produced Ridley Scott's epic film Kingdom of Heaven, making it the biggest production in the history of Spanish cinema.

Box office 
Highest-grossing films of all-time
The 10 highest-grossing Spanish films of all time (as of 2019) by domestic box office gross revenue are listed as follows:

Spanish films
 Lists of Spanish films

See also
 Catalan cinema
 Cinema of the world
 World cinema
 Media of Spain
 Spanish art
 History of Spain
 Spanish Literature
 Sant Jordi Awards

References

Further reading
 Marsha Kinder: Blood Cinema: The Reconstruction of National Identity in Spain, University of California Press, 1993, 
 Marvin D'Lugo: Guide to the Cinema of Spain (Reference Guides to the World's Cinema), Greenwood Pub Group, 1997
 Nuria Triana-Toribio: Spanish National Cinema (National Cinemas Series), Routledge 2002, 
 The Cinema of Spain and Portugal (24 Frames (Paper), ed. by Alberto Mira, Wallflower Press 2005 – 24 films are analyzed
 Ronald Schwartz: Great Spanish Films Since 1950, Scarecrow Press, 2008
 Tatjana Pavlovic: 100 Years of Spanish Cinema, John Wiley & Sons, 2008
 Juan Antonio Gavilán Sánchez y Manuel Lamarca Rosales: Conversaciones con cineastas españoles, Servicio de Publicaciones de la Universidad de Córdoba, 2002. .
  Manuel Lamarca y Juan Ignacio Valenzuela: Cómo crear una película. Anatomía de una profesión, T&B Editores, Madrid, 2008. .

External links
 Top 10 movies from Spain according to IMDB.com
 Discussion of 10 key films in Spanish cinema at subtitledonline.com
 Ministry of Culture of Spain, Cinema Web
 Official website of Viva Pedro series celebrating the films of Pedro Almodovar
 Spanish movie reviews
 Silver Screen Spain. Information about shooting locations around Spain of English-language movies.
 Spanish film reviews in English